Züğürt Ağa is a 1985 Turkish comedy film directed by Nesli Çölgeçen.

Cast 
 Şener Şen - The Agha
 Erdal Özyağcılar - Kekec Salman
 Nilgün Nazli - Kiraz
 Füsun Demirel - The Agha's wife

External links 

1985 films
1985 comedy films
Films scored by Attila Özdemiroğlu
Turkish comedy films
1980s Turkish-language films